Bougadoum  is a town and commune in the Hodh Ech Chargui Region of southern Mauritania.

In 2013 it had a census population of 40,341.

References

Communes of Hodh Ech Chargui Region